Kerstin Brachtendorf (born 22 May 1972) is a German Para-cyclist who represented Germany in the Paralympics Games.

Career
Brachtendorf represented Germany in the women's road time trial C5 event at the 2020 Summer Paralympics and won a bronze medal.

References

External links
 
 
 

1972 births
Living people
German female cyclists
Paralympic medalists in cycling
Paralympic bronze medalists for Germany
Cyclists at the 2012 Summer Paralympics
Cyclists at the 2016 Summer Paralympics
Cyclists at the 2020 Summer Paralympics
Medalists at the 2020 Summer Paralympics
People from Mayen-Koblenz
Cyclists from Rhineland-Palatinate
20th-century German women
21st-century German women